The Boccia Pairs BC3 event at the 2008 Summer Paralympics was held in the Olympic Green Convention Center on 10–12 September.
The preliminary stages consisted of 2 round-robin groups of 4 competitors each. The top two teams in each group qualified for the final stages.
The event was won by the team representing .

Results

Preliminaries

Pool A

Pool B

 after extra (fifth) end

Competition bracket

Entry List

References

Boccia at the 2008 Summer Paralympics